Emotional competence and Emotional capital refer to the essential set of personal and social skills to recognize, interpret, and respond constructively to emotions in oneself and others. The term implies an ease around others and determines one's ability to effectively and successfully lead and express.

Definition 
Emotional competence refers to an important set of personal and social skills for identifying, interpreting, and constructively responding to emotions in oneself and others. The term implies ease in getting along with others and determines one's ability to lead and express effectively and successfully. Psychologists define emotional competence as the ability to monitor one's own and others' feelings and emotions and to use this information to guide one's thinking and actions.

Description 
Emotional competence is another term for emotional intelligence. It describes a person's ability to express their emotions completely freely, and it comes from emotional intelligence, the ability to recognize emotions.  Individual’s emotional competence (EC) is considered to be an important predictor of their ability to adapt to their environment, and it refers primarily to their ability to identification, understanding, expression, regulation, and use their own and other’s emotions.Emotional competence is often referred to in social contexts, and is considered a capability of recognizing their own emotions, as well as those of others and expressing them in socially acceptable ways. Competence is the level of skill at which a person interacts constructively with others. This personal emotional capacity is based on a person's perception of their emotions and how they affect others, as well as the ability to maintain control and adaptation of emotions.

History
In 1999, Carolyn Saarni wrote a book named The Development of Emotional Competence. Saarni believes that emotional abilities are not innate, but are cultivated and developed through children's interactions with others, especially family members and peers. Saarni defines emotional capacity as the functional ability of humans to achieve goals after experiencing an emotion-eliciting encounter. She defines emotion as a component of self-efficacy, and she describes the use of emotions as a set of skills that lead to the development of emotional capacity.

Examples
Understand others  - to be aware of other people's feelings and perspectives.

Develop others - Be aware of the development needs of others and enhance their capabilities.

Service orientation - anticipate, recognize and meet customer needs.

Leverage diversity - nurture opportunities through different types of people.

Intelligence Quotient and Emotional Quotient 
Intelligence Quotient(IQ) is a measure of a person’s reasoning ability, which is first introduced by the German psychologist Louis William Stern, as a qualitative methods of assessing individual difference. Emotional Quotient (EQ)  is a measure of a self-emotional control ability, which is first introduced in American psychologist Peter Salovey in 1991. The emotional quotient is commonly referred to in the field of psychology as emotional intelligence(also known as emotional competence or emotional skills). IQ reflects a person's cognitive and observational abilities and how quickly they can use reasoning to solve problems. EQ, on the other hand, is an index of a person's ability to manage their own emotions and to manage the emotions of others.

Daniel Goleman’s five components of EQ 
In Daniel Goleman’s Emotional Intelligence(published in 1995), he introduced five components of EQ, self-awareness, self regulation, motivation, empathy, and social skills.

 Self-awareness: precise awareness of self emotions
 Self-regulation: controlled emotional expression
 Motivation: emotional self-motivation
 Empathy: adept at modulating the emotional responses of others and helping them to express their emotions
 Social skills: excellent communication skills

EI and the Four-Branch Model 
Psychologists see emotional competence as a continuum, ranging from lower levels of emotional competence to perform mental functions to complex emotional competence for personal self-control and management. The higher levels of emotional competence, on the other hand, comprise four branches: 

 Perceive emotions in oneself and others accurately
 Use emotions to facilitate thinking
 Understand emotions, emotional language, and the signals conveyed by emotions
 Manage emotions so as to attain specific goals

Each branch describes a set of skills that make up overall emotional intelligence, ranging from low to high complexity. For example, perceiving emotions usually begins with the ability to perceive basic emotions from faces and vocal tones, and may progress to the accurate perception of emotional blends and the capture and understanding of facial micro-expressions.

Assertiveness 

Building up emotional competence is one way of learning to handle manipulative or passive-aggressive behavior in which the manipulator exploits the feelings of another to try to get what they want.

See also
 Intercultural competence
 Personal Competence 
Self-Awareness – Know one’s internal states, preferences, resources and intuitions. The competencies in this category include:

 Emotional Awareness – Recognize one’s emotions and their effects
 Accurate Self-Assessment – Know one’s strengths and limits
 Self-Confidence – A strong sense of one’s self-worth and abilities
 Self-Regulation – Manage one’s internal states, impulses and resources.
Social competence
Empathy – Awareness of others’ feelings, needs and concerns. The competencies in this category include:

 Understand Others – Sense others’ feelings and perspectives
 Develop Others – Sense others’ development needs and bolstering their abilities
 Service Orientation – Anticipate, recognize and meet customers’ needs
 Leverage Diversity – Cultivate opportunities through different kinds of people
 Political Awareness – Read a group’s emotional currents and power relationships
 Emotional intelligence

Notes

References
 Dickson, Anne (2000) Trusting the Tides London: Rider
 Gendron, Benedicte (2018) "The Power of The Emotional Capital in Education : Executive Functions, Heutagogy and Meditation/Mindfulness, Paris : Ed. Connaissances & Savoirs.  https://www.connaissances-savoirs.com/the-power-of-the-emotional-capital-in-education.html/
 Gendron, Benedicte (2004) "Why Emotional Capital Matters in Education and in Labour? Toward an Optimal Use of Human Capital and Knowledge Management", in Les Cahiers de la Maison des Sciences Economiques, série rouge, n° 113, Paris : Université Panthéon-Sorbonne.  https://halshs.archives-ouvertes.fr/file/index/docid/201223/filename/B-Gendron-emotional-capital-article04-signature-actualisee05.pdf
 Gendron, Benedicte et Lafortune Louise (2008), Leadership et compétences émotionnelles, de l'engagement au changement, Presses universitaires du Québec.
 Gendron, Benedicte  (2015), Mindful management & capital émotionnel, L'humain au coeur d'une performance et d'une économie bienveillantes, Coll. RH,  Bruxelles, Ed. De Boeck
 Heron, John (1992) Feeling and Personhood London: Sage
 Postle Denis (2003) Letting the Heart Sing - The Mind Gymnasium London: Wentworth
 Saarni, C. (1999). The development of emotional competence. Guilford press.
 Goleman, Camp, J., & Lyon, R. (1999). Emotional intelligence. PBS Home Video.
 Brasseur Sophie (2013) The Profile of Emotional Competence(PEC): Development and Validation of a Self-Reported Measure that Fits Dimensions of Emotional Competence Theory. PLoS ONE. http://dx.doi.org/10.1371/journal.pone.0062635
 Mikolajczak Moria (2014) Measuring intrapersonal and interpersonal EQ: The Short profile of Emotional Competence. ELSEVIER.http://dx.doi.org/10.1016/j.paid.2014.01.023
 Mayer, John D (2008). Emotional Intelligence: New Ability or Eclectic Traits. The American Psychologist. (63, 6): 503–517.http://dx.doi.org/10.1037/0003-066X.63.6.503
 Goleman, Daniel (1995). Emotional Intelligence [M]. Bantam Books.

External links 
 The Swedish Empathy Center Organizes knowledge about empathy across disciplines
 GENDRON Benedicte (2004) Why Emotional Capital Matters in Education and in Labour? Toward an Optimal Exploitation of Human Capital and Knowledge Management, in Les Cahiers de la Maison des Sciences Economiques, série rouge, n° 113, Paris : Université Panthéon-Sorbonne.
 GENDRON Benedicte (dir. 2007) Émotions, compétences émotionnelles et capital émotionnel, Les Cahiers du Cerfee, n°23, Presses Universitaires de La Méditerranée.
 GENDRON Benedicte (2010) The Informal to Formal Learning Development of Emotional Capital for Sustainable Citizenship Development, edited by Peter Cunningham and Nathan Fretwell, published in London by CiCe .

Human communication
Psychological adjustment
Emotional issues

de:Emotionale Kompetenz